CXS is the ICAO code of Boston-Maine Airways.

CXS may also refer to:
Conlang X-SAMPA, an unofficial extension of X-SAMPA
The Crüxshadows, an independent music group from Florida